Mohammed Khalaf (Arabic:محمد خلف) (born 21 December 2000) is an Emirati footballer. He currently plays as a goalkeeper for Baniyas.

External links

References

Emirati footballers
1989 births
Living people
Al Wahda FC players
Baniyas Club players
Al-Shaab CSC players
UAE First Division League players
UAE Pro League players
Association football goalkeepers